Hvert minut is a song written by Jan Lysdahl and Søren Poppe, and originally released by Søren Poppe in the year 2002.

Emilia Rydberg recording
Pär Lönn and Emilia Rydberg wrote lyrics in Swedish, as "Var minut". With these lyrics, the song was recorded by Emilia Rydberg, who released it as a single in 2006. She also recorded it on the 2007 album Små ord av kärlek.

Single track listings
Var minut
Var minut (R&B)
Efter festen

Charts

References

External links

2002 songs
2006 singles
Emilia Rydberg songs
Danish-language songs